Zhang Jingyi (born 7 July 1997) is a Chinese football player who currently plays as a goalkeeper for Nanjing City.

Career

He started his career at Jiangsu F.C., but the club soon dissolved. He joined Nanjing City F.C. in 2021, and was the sub keeper from the 12 July 2021 to 30 September 2021, deputizing for Huang Zihao, who also joined from Jiangsu.

He made his debut against Zhejiang Professional F.C. on 30 October 2021.

He made two more appearances that season, coming on in the 76th minute against Xinjiang Tianshan on 7 December 2021, and starting against Zibo Cuju F.C. on 21 December 2021.

In the 2022 season, he once again deputized or Huang Zihao, but started against Guangxi Pingguo on 20 July 2022.

References

External links

Living people
Footballers from Jiangsu
Nanjing City F.C. players
Jiangsu F.C. players
1997 births
Association football goalkeepers
Chinese footballers